Nancy Churnin is an American author and journalist. Churnin is a former theater critic for The Dallas Morning News and has published ten children's books as of October 2021.

Early life
Churnin was born and raised in New York City. She received a bachelor's degree from Harvard University and an M.S. in journalism from Columbia University.

Journalistic career
Churnin worked as a theater critic for the San Diego edition of the Los Angeles Times from 1986 to 1992. In 2000, she joined the staff of The Dallas Morning News, writing about such topics as health, lifestyles, children's entertainment, and parenting. In January 2014, Churnin became the primary theater critic for The Dallas Morning News, a position she left in January 2019.

Children's books
Churnin's first picture book, The William Hoy Story: How a Deaf Baseball Player Changed the Game was published in 2016. Manjhi Moves a Mountain, another children's picture book by Churnin, was published in 2017. Three children's books by Churnin were released in 2018, Charlie Takes His Shot: How Charlie Sifford Broke the Color Barrier in Golf, Irving Berlin, the Immigrant Boy Who Made America Sing, and The Queen and the First Christmas Tree, Queen Charlotte's Gift to England.  Churnin's sixth book, Martin & Anne, the Kindred Spirits of Dr. Martin Luther King, Jr. and Anne Frank, was released on March 5, 2019. Beautiful Shades of Brown, the Art of Laura Wheeler Waring  and For Spacious Skies, Katharine Lee Bates and the Inspiration for "America the Beautiful"  were released in 2020. Dear Mr. Dickens, published in 2021, received a National Jewish Book Award and a Sydney Taylor Book Award. A Queen to the Rescue, the Story of Henrietta Szold, Founder of Hadassah was published in 2021  and also received a Sydney Taylor Book Award.

Personal life
Churnin met her husband, Michael Granberry, while they were both writing for the San Diego edition of the Los Angeles Times. They have four sons.

References

External links

American children's writers
American newspaper journalists
American theater critics
American women journalists
20th-century American non-fiction writers
21st-century American non-fiction writers
Writers from Dallas
Writers from New York City
Harvard University alumni
Columbia University Graduate School of Journalism alumni
Living people
20th-century American women writers
21st-century American women writers
Year of birth missing (living people)